David Čep (born 4 October 1980 in Šternberk) is a Czech football defender who played in the Czech Gambrinus liga for two teams, as well as the Corgoň liga for Tatran Prešov. He currently plays for 1. HFK Olomouc.

References

External links
at official club website 

1980 births
Living people
People from Šternberk
Czech footballers
Association football defenders
Czech First League players
SK Sigma Olomouc players
Bohemians 1905 players
FC Vysočina Jihlava players
1. HFK Olomouc players
SK Hanácká Slavia Kroměříž players
Slovak Super Liga players
1. FC Tatran Prešov players
Expatriate footballers in Slovakia
Czech expatriate sportspeople in Slovakia
Czech expatriate footballers
Sportspeople from the Olomouc Region